Keith Ward (born 17 June 1994) is an Irish association football player who plays as a midfielder for League of Ireland club Dundalk. Ward began his professional career at UCD before moving to the Lilywhites for the first of three spells. He made his debut for Bohemians in 2012. Ward moved on from Bohemians to have spells at Sligo Rovers and Derry City respectively, before returning to Bohs for the 2017 season. Ward joined a select number of Bohemian players when he scored in an away tie in European competition against Hungarian side Fehérvár during Bohs UEFA Europa League qualifier in 2020. Bohemians were eventually knocked out on penalties. Ward signed for his current team, Dundalk, in December 2021, with his deal effective from January 2022, when his contract at Bohemians ends.

Honours
League of Ireland Premier Division
 Winner 2014
 Runner-up 2013, 2020
 League of Ireland Cup 
 Winner 2014
FAI Cup
Runner-up 2021
Setanta Cup
 Runner-up 2011, 2014

References

1992 births
Living people
Bohemian F.C. players
Republic of Ireland association footballers
Association football midfielders